The Kingdom of Jesus Christ (KJC), officially the Kingdom of Jesus Christ, The Name Above Every Name, Inc., is a Philippine-based non-Trinitarian Restorationist-Protestant church. It was founded by Pastor Apollo Quiboloy, whom KJC adherents believe to be the "Appointed Son of God".

The members of the congregation refer to their community as a "Kingdom Nation". They claim about 2 million "Kingdom citizens" abroad and 4 million in the Philippines.

History
Before the establishment of the Kingdom of Jesus Christ (KJC) religious group, its founder Apollo Quiboloy was said to have gone on an exile to Tamayong for five years and later at Sitio Kitbog at the foot of Mount Matutum in South Cotabato. Quiboloy says that it was revelations from God through his dreams which led him to the foundation of the KJC.

In fact, Quiboloy is a former member of the United Pentecostal Church of the Philippines, a Oneness Pentecostal denomination.

Apollo Quiboloy's father, José, was already a Protestant (a member of the Christian and Missionary Alliance), but converted to Oneness Pentecostalism with four sons, who all became preachers and leaders in the United Pentecostal Church of the Philippines (UPCP), the largest Filipino Oneness Pentecostal church, which is affiliated to the U.S.-based United Pentecostal Church International. Apollo became president of the powerful UPCP youth organization in 1974, but was expelled from the UPCP in 1979 for unorthodox teachings. He repented, apologized, and was accepted back into the fold in 1980 as pastor of the Agdao Church in Davao City, one of the historical UPCP churches.

In 1985, Apollo was put again under investigation by the UPCP for his arrogant attitudes towards other pastors. Rather than submitting to trial, he left the UPCP with some 15 followers on September 1, 1985, and started his own denomination.

Apollo's church started on September 1, 1985, and Quiboloy's prayer house was situated along Villamor Street in Agdao, Davao City.

As of October 2016, the KJC Church reportedly claims to have 4 million tithed followers in the Philippines, and 2 million followers outside the country.

Beliefs
The KJC believes that its founder, Apollo Quiboloy, is the "Appointed Son of God". A self-described account of Quiboloy's birth involves God coming to his mother as a cloud to declare him as his son. Members of the church, also called "Kingdom citizens", believe that salvation is exclusive to its members. Such belief has been made as counter to mainstream Christianity.

Linked organizations
Organizations like the Children's Joy Foundation and the Sonshine Philippines Movement are connected to the KJC. The Children's Joy Foundation focuses on providing humanitarian aid to destitute children, while the Sonshine Philippines Movement is involved in reforestation and disaster-relief efforts.

Controversies

Human trafficking raids
On January 29, 2020, the Federal Bureau of Investigation (FBI) raided KJC offices in California, Texas, and Hawaii, after receiving complaints by former members that the church has been committing immigration fraud.

According to testimonies taken by the FBI, the KJC has conducted 82 sham marriages in the past 20 years in order to keep them illegally in the United States. They said that the victims were invited as guests to a fundraiser concert for the Children's Joy Foundation, one of the church's charity arms. Once they arrived, they were forced to solicit donations on the streets and sell pastries, such as Krispy Kreme doughnuts, claiming that they're raising funds for the church, receiving little to no pay and were met with steep quota requirements. One of the victims even said that young church workers were physically or psychologically abused if they did not work well during incredible hours.

They allegedly received punishments, such as paddling or isolation in a walled room for three to five days while being denied food and water and listened to pre-recorded sermons of the church. One victim was even forced to shave her head and wear an orange shirt with "SOS" or "Son of Satan" in the back.

Three people — Guia Cabactulan, Marissa Duenas, and Amanda Estopare — were arrested and charged with conspiracy to commit immigration fraud. Both Cabactulan and Duenas were arrested in Van Nuys, while Estopare was arrested in Norfolk, Virginia.

Church officials, however, said that the investigation is based on testimony from disgruntled former church members who were allowed to stay in the country longer in exchange for their testimony.

Child sex trafficking indictment
In 2021, Quiboloy was indicted of child sex trafficking. Prosecutors found that he, along with other members of his church, sexually and physically abused minors as young as 12, forcing children into having sex with him through so-called "night duties" or else face "eternal damnation" and more physical abuses. His wealth was also noted as ill-gotten and that he abused church donations to create his own lavish lifestyle.

References

Christian denominations established in the 20th century
Christian denominations founded in the Philippines
Restorationism (Christianity)
Christian new religious movements
1985 establishments in the Philippines